Pigment Violet 29 (C.I. 71129) is an organic compound that is used as a pigment  and vat dye. Its colour is dark red purple, or bordeaux.

Structurally, it is a derivative of perylene, although it is produced from acenaphthene. It is a less common dye compared to related derivatives such as pigment red 190 (Vat Red 29).

Violet 29 is used in watercolors, acrylic paints, automotive paints, inks for printing and packaging, cleaning and washing agents, pharmaceuticals, solar cells, paper, sporting goods, industrial carpeting, and food packaging.

Toxicology 
Violet 29 is derived from the polycyclic aromatic hydrocarbon perylene. Perylene is less toxic than its well-studied cousin benzo[a]pyrene. Little is actually known about the mechanistic toxicology of violet 29, so the EPA findings are based on occupational hazard studies. Violet 29 is extreme insoluble in water and octanol, so any exposure routes are considered to be by inhalation of dust. Thus, the EPA determined that occupational exposure was realistically the only way any toxic levels could be reached in any group.

EPA Risk Review 
Violet 29 is under risk evaluation review by the US EPA as part of the Toxic Substances Control Act.

In early 2021, the US EPA Final Risk Review found "no unreasonable risk" to the environment, consumers, bystanders, or the general population for any conditions of use for Violet 29  However, the EPA found an "unreasonable risk" to workers from the domestic manufacturing or import of the chemical and nearly all uses and disposal. This finding under TSCA is for alveolar hyperplasia, inflammatory and morphological changes in the lower respiratory tract for chronic inhalation exposures. 

The finding of "unreasonable risk" requires the EPA to work to reduce or manage the risk, including banning the use of a particular chemical.

References 

Perylene dyes
Vat dyes
Imides